The Barmedman Creek, a mostlyperennial river that is part of the Lachlan sub-catchment of the Murrumbidgee catchment within the Murray–Darling basin, is located in the South West Slopes, and Riverina regions of New South Wales, Australia. The Barmedman Creek is only connected to the Murray Darling basin when the Bland Creek, the Lachlan and Murrumbidgee Rivers are in flood.

Course and features 
The creek descends  over its  course.

See also 

 List of rivers of New South Wales (A-K)
 Rivers of New South Wales

References

External links
 
  

Tributaries of the Lachlan River
Rivers of New South Wales
Rivers in the Riverina